Dihydrotestosterone undecanoate (DHTU), also known as androstanolone undecanoate or stanolone undecanoate, is a synthetic androgen and anabolic steroid (AAS) which was never marketed. It is an androgen ester; specifically, it is the C17β undecanoate (undecylate) ester of dihydrotestosterone (DHT). DHTU is a prodrug of DHT. Similarly to testosterone undecanoate (TU), DHTU is orally active. It occurs as an important active metabolite of oral TU. The 5α-reductase inhibitor finasteride in combination with oral TU has no effect on the first-pass transformation of TU into DHTU or DHT, probably because of its unique lymphatic route of absorption. Oral DHTU may be absorbed by the lymphatic system similarly to TU, and this may explain its oral bioavailability.

See also
 List of androgen esters § Dihydrotestosterone esters

References

Abandoned drugs
Androgens and anabolic steroids
Androstanes
Dihydrotestosterone esters
Human drug metabolites
Ketones
Prodrugs
Undecanoate esters